L'esquisse is a 2005 studio album by Argentinian-French rapper Keny Arkana.

Track listing
 "Le Missile Est Lancé" 3:53
 "Venez Voir" 3:17
 "Le Temps Passe Et S'Écoule" 3:16
 "Ca Nous Correspond Pas" 7:31
 "Le Rap A Perdu Ses Esprits" 4:10
 "Faut Qu'On S'En Sorte" 3:05
 "Style Libre" 5:57
 "J'Ai Besoin D'Air" 3:37
 "Tout Le Monde Debout" 3:26
 "Jeunesse De L'Occident" 2:10
 "La Main Sur Le Coeur" 2:29
 "Dur D'Être Optimiste" 3:04
 "J'Lève Ma Rime" 4:01
 "De L'Opéra À La Plaine" 7:38
 "Outro" 3:44
 "Medley" L'Usine À Adulte / Les Murs De Ma Ville Rmx 3:17

Charts

References

Keny Arkana albums
2005 albums